Igor Mikhailovich Kuznetsov (born October 19, 1955) is a former Kazakhstani-German professional ice hockey player. He is currently an executive and founding chairman of the KIMEX and Grazie chain stores.

Career
Igor Kuznetsov is the graduate of Alma-Ata ice hockey school. He began his playing career at the Burevestnik Alma-Ata team. However, his best years he played for Torpedo Ust-Kamenogorsk, when he captained 10 years and was team top scorer three times in 1984-85 (76 points: 43 G, 33 A), 1985-86 (98 points: 53 G, 45 A) and 1988-89 (90 points: 44 G, 46 A) seasons. After Soviet Union collapse, he went to play to Finnish team HPK, where he helped to win bronze medals at SM-liiga in 1991. In 1991, Kuznetsov signed a contract with German team EC Ratingen and helped to promote them to 2nd Bundesliga. He played 43 games and scored 37 goals. Next season he ended his career because of a foot fracture.

Career statistics

References

External links

Living people
1955 births
Sportspeople from Almaty
Kazakhstani people of Russian descent
German people of Russian descent
Soviet ice hockey players
Kazakhstani ice hockey players
German ice hockey centres
Kazzinc-Torpedo players
Avtomobilist Karagandy players
Kazakhstani emigrants to Germany